Baltimore Cemetery may refer to:

 Baltimore Cemetery, at the site of the historic town of Baltimore, Indiana; a cemetery in Warren County, Indiana
 Baltimore Cemetery, in Berea, Baltimore, Maryland
 Baltimore National Cemetery, in Baltimore, Maryland
 Bohemian National Cemetery (Baltimore, Maryland)